Marshall L. Summar (born September 2, 1959 in Nashville, Tennessee) is a physician, clinical geneticist and academic specializing in the field of genetics and rare disease.

He is board-certified in pediatrics, biochemical genetics and clinical genetics. He is best known for his work in caring for children with rare genetic diseases.

Summar is currently the Chief Executive Officer of Uncommon Cures LLC  and director of the Rare Disease Institute Laboratories. In 2022, after 12 years he stepped down as RDI Director and as Chief of Genetics and Metabolism. He is the Margaret O’Malley Professor of Genetic Medicine at Children’s National Health System in Washington, D.C.  He’s also a professor in the Department of Pediatrics at the George Washington University School of Medicine & Health Sciences.

Biography 
Summar received his M.D. from the University of Tennessee Center for Health Sciences in 1985 and performed his pediatric residency at Vanderbilt University School of Medicine. From 1988-1990, Summar completed his clinical fellowship within the Division of Medical Genetics at Vanderbilt University School of Medicine – he trained in clinical/biochemical genetics and in genetics research.

From 1990 to 2010, Summar remained with Vanderbilt University School of Medicine, serving first as an associate and assistant professor. In 2008, he was named a professor of the Department of Pediatrics and the Department of Molecular Physiology & Biophysics

Summar joined Children’s National in 2010 as chief of the Division of Genetics and Metabolism, and became professor of Pediatrics at George Washington School of Medicine. From 2016 to 2020 Summar served as chairman of the board of directors for the National Organization for Rare Disorders (NORD), after serving as chair of the organization’s scientific and medical advisory committee.  He currently sits on the NIH NCATS Advisory Council.  He serves as a Commissioner for the Global Commission to End the Diagnostic Odyssey for Children with a Rare Disease. He is on the steering committee of the Black Women's Health Imperative Rare Disease Diversity Coalition and co-chairs the research committee.  Summar serves on the Board of Directors of PHLOW pharmaceuticals, a public benefit corporation moving generic drug manufacturing into the United States.  In 2022, Summar was awarded the National Organization for Rare Disorders Lifetime Achievement Award.

Children’s National Rare Disease Institute (CNRDI) 
In January 2017 under Summar's leadership, Children’s National announced the formation of the Children’s National Rare Disease Institute (CNRDI), center dedicated to advancing the care and treatment of children and adults with rare genetic disorders. The CNRDI was designated by NORD as the first Center of Excellence for Clinical Care in Rare Disease in the United States.

Led by Summar, who served as inaugural director, the CNRDI’s primary goal is to improve the lifespan and quality of life for patients living with rare disease, and has grown into one of the world's largest clinical genetics centers. The Institute employs a multi-disciplinary team of healthcare specialists and serves as a medical home for rare disease patients. In September 2022, Summar turned over the Director role to Dr. Debra Regier, M.D., Ph.D..

Other Activities 
In 2023, Dr. Summar led a team to found a rare disease clinical research organization, Uncommon Cures LLC.  The goal of UCC is to promote efficiency through strategic centralization and decentralization of research practices in the rare disease field. 
Since 2022, Dr. Summar and Dr. Paul Harris have led a team in a collaboration between Children's National Hospital and Vanderbilt University building a new software platform to create and host clinical treatment protocols for rare diseases.  This RareCap program will provide a curated database of protocols to address the rapidly expanding number of described rare diseases.

Research 
Summar has published over 170 peer-reviewed articles and is considered an international expert on inborn errors of metabolism, specifically urea cycle disorders.  His laboratory is best known for its work on rare disorders involving ammonia and nitrogen metabolism. Summar’s work on urea cycle disorders has involved translational research, development of treatment protocols, and basic molecular research into rare defects in urea and nitrogen metabolism.

Summar also specializes in the development of devices and therapies for patients with rare genetic and biochemical diseases, as well as applying knowledge from rare disorders to mainstream medicine. His current research is focused on the interactions between the environment and common genetic variations and involves research in asthma, heart disease, oxidant injury, pulmonary hypertension, liver disease, and Down syndrome.

Summar’s work has yielded more than 100 international patents, as well as new therapies in clinical trials (including FDA studies) for patients dealing with congenital heart disease, sickle cell anemia, and premature birth.

In addition to his laboratory’s research, Summar is focused on newborn screening policy issues and the development of testing and follow-up systems. He has also organized and headed international work groups focused on developing standards of care and treatment for rare disorders and developed a program in coordination with the NIH to help young children benefit from NIH research initiatives.

References 

American geneticists
People from Nashville, Tennessee
George Washington University faculty
Vanderbilt University School of Medicine alumni
1959 births
Living people